The 2001–02 Turkish Second League Category A was the second-level football league of Turkey and the 39th season since its establishment in 1963–64. At the end of the season in which 20 teams competed in a single group, Altay, Elazığspor and Adanaspor, which finished the league in the first three places, were promoted to the upper league, while Hatayspor, Siirtspor, Erciyesspor, Batman Petrolspor and Aydınspor, which were in the last five places, were relegated.

Final standings

Results

Top goalscorers

References 

 

TFF First League seasons
Turkey
1